Cnemaspis amith, also known as the Amith's daygecko, is a species of diurnal gecko. It is endemic to island of Sri Lanka.

References

amith
Reptiles of Sri Lanka
Endemic fauna of Sri Lanka
Reptiles described in 2007
Taxa named by Rohan Pethiyagoda